Two ships of the United States Navy have borne the name USS Harder, named in honor of the harder, a fish of the mullet family found off South Africa.

, was a  submarine, commissioned in 1942 and sunk in 1944
, was a  submarine, commissioned in 1952 and struck in 1974

United States Navy ship names